Shanti Lal Chaplot is a senior Bharatiya Janata Party (BJP) leader from Rajasthan, India, former MP and former Speaker of Rajasthan Legislative Assembly from 7 April 1995 to 18 March 1998.

He was born on 2 March 1946 to Shri Chunilal Chaplot in Sanwad in Udaipur district. He is a five time MLA from Mavli, Udaipur district, & was elected as a member of 12th Lok Sabha from Udaipur. He has also been awarded the "Best MLA award" in 2008.

References

 CHAPLOT, SHRI SHANTI LAL
 Affidavits

Speakers of the Rajasthan Legislative Assembly
People from Udaipur district
Rajasthani people
India MPs 1998–1999
1946 births
Living people
Lok Sabha members from Rajasthan
Deputy Speakers of the Rajasthan Legislative Assembly
Bharatiya Janata Party politicians from Rajasthan